The RFE Phonetic Alphabet, named for a journal of philology, the  (RFE), is a phonetic alphabet originally developed in 1915 for the languages and dialects of Iberian origin, primarily Spanish. Additionally, this phonetic alphabet is taught at the universities of Spanish-speaking countries such as Mexico.

Symbols

Sources 
 RFE (1915) "Alfabeto fonético de la revista de filología española"; Revista de Filología Española 2: 374-376.
 Navarro Tomás, Tomás (1966) "El alfabeto fonético de la Revista de Filología Española"; Anuario de Letras 6: 5-19.

See also 
 Phonetics
 Phonology
 Phonetic transcription
 International Phonetic Alphabet
 Phonetic alphabet (disambiguation)

References

Bibliography
 Alvar, Manuel; & Mouton, Pilar García. Textos Andaluces en Transcription fonética. Madrid : Editorial Gredos. 
 Cuétara Priede, Javier. 2004. Fonética de la ciudad de México: Aportaciones desde las tecnologías del habla. México : Universidad Nacional Autónoma de México. 
 Face, Timothy L. 2008. Guide to the Phonetic Symbols of Spanish. Sommerville, MA: Cascadilla Press.
 García Mouton, Pilar; & Moreno Fernández, Francisco (dir.). 2003. « Alfabeto fonético y otros signos », in Atlas Lingüístico (y etnográfico) de Castilla - La Mancha, Universidad de Alcalá. <http://www2.uah.es/alecman> 
 Llisterri, Joaquim. 2012. La Transcription fonética, Universitat Autònoma de Barcelona.
 Navarro Tomás, Tomás. 1915. “Alfabeto fonético ”, in Revista de Filología Española, tomo 2, pp. 374–376. 
 Navarro Tomás, Tomás. 1966. “El alfabeto fonético de la Revista de Filología Española”, in Anuario de Letras, tome 6, 1966, pp. 5–19. 
 Martín Butragueño, Pedro. 2012. Fonología variable del español de México. sección Alfabeto fonético 
 Pop, Sever. La dialectologie : aperçu historique et méthodes d'enquêtes linguistiques, J. Duculot, Louvain, 1950, 2 vol. (volumen 1 y volumen 2)
 El International Phonetic Alphabet y el de la RFE

External links
 Irabar, Alexander. ''La transcripción fonética: Comentarios y materiales.

Phonetic alphabets
1915 introductions
1915 in Spain
Spanish phonology
1915 in science